The 2015, was the 2º Torneo Federal A season since it became part of the third tier of the Argentine football league system. The tournament is reserved for teams indirectly affiliated to the Asociación del Fútbol Argentino (AFA), while teams affiliated to AFA  have to play the Primera B Metropolitana, which is the other third tier competition. The champion will be promoted to Primera B Nacional. 40 teams competed. The regular season began on March 20 and ended on December 10.

Format

First stage
The teams were divided into four zones with ten teams (a total of 40 teams) in each zone and it was played in a round-robin tournament. The teams placed 1º to 3º and the two best 4º team from the four zones qualified for the Second Stage.

Second Stage

Tetradecagonal Final
Consisted of fourteen (14) teams that qualified from the First Stage and the winner was declared champion and automatically promoted to the Primera B Nacional. It was played in a round-robin system. The teams placed 2º to 4º advanced directly to the Fifth Stage, while the teams placed 5º to 14º advanced to the Third Stage.

Reválida
The twenty six (26) teams that did not qualify for the Tetradecagonal Final were grouped into two zones of thirteen (13) teams. The teams placed 1º to 5º of both zones advanced to the Third Stage.

Third Stage
The teams placed 5º to 14º from the Tetradecagonal Final and the teams placed 1º to 5º of both zones of the Revalida Stage (20 teams) played against each other in a Double-elimination tournament. The 10 winning teams advanced to the Fourth Stage.

Fourth Stage
The 10 winning teams coming from the Third Stage played against each other in a Double-elimination tournament. The 5 winning teams advanced to the Fifth Stage.

Fifth Stage
The teams placed 2º to 4º in the Tetradecagonal Final and the 5 winning teams coming from the Fourth Stage played against each other in a Double-elimination tournament. The 4 winning teams advanced to the Fifth Stage.

Sixth Stage
The 4 winning teams coming from the Fifth Stage played against each other in a Double-elimination tournament. The 2 winning teams advanced to the Seventh Stage.

Seventh Stage
The 2 winning teams coming from the Fifth Stage played against each other in a Double-elimination tournament. The winning team was promoted to the Primera B Nacional.

Relegation
After the Revalida Stage a table was drawn up with the addition of points of the First Stage and Revalida Stage, the last four of both zones were relegated to Torneo Federal B.

Club information

Zone 1

1 Play their home games at Estadio José María Minella.

Zone 2

Zone 3

1 Play their home games at Estadio Antonio Romero.

Zone 4

First stage

Zone 1

Results

Zone 2

Results

Zone 3

Results

Zone 4

Results

Ranking of fourth-placed teams

Second Stage

Tetradecagonal

Results

Revalida

Zone A

Results

Zone B

Results

Relegation

Zone A

Torneo Federal B relegation play-off

Zone B

Third to Seventh Stage

Third Stage

|-

|-

|-

|-

|-

|-

|-

|-

|-

|-

Fourth Stage

|-

|-

|-

|-

|-

Fifth Stage

|-

|-

|-

|-

Sixth Stage

|-

|-

Seventh Stage

|-

Season statistics

Top scorers

See also
 2015 Primera B Nacional
 2014–15 Copa Argentina

References

External links
 Sitio Oficial de AFA   
 Ascenso del Interior  
 Solo Ascenso  
 Mundo Ascenso  
 Promiedos  

Torneo Federal A seasons
3